Tímea Tóth (born 16 September 1980) is a former Hungarian handballer who most recently played for Érdi VSE and the Hungarian national team.

Achievements
Nemzeti Bajnokság I:
Winner: 2002, 2007
Silver Medalist: 2001, 2003, 2006
Bronze Medalist: 2004, 2005
Magyar Kupa:
Winner: 2001, 2003
Silver Medalist: 2007
Austrian Championship:
Winner: 2008, 2009
ÖHB Cup:
Winner: 2008, 2009
EHF Champions League:
Finalist: 2002, 2008
Semifinalist: 2001, 2009
EHF Cup:
Winner: 2006
Semifinalist: 2005
EHF Cup Winners' Cup:
Semifinalist: 2007
EHF Champions Trophy:
Finalist: 2008
Fourth Placed: 2006
World Championship:
Silver Medalist: 2003
Bronze Medalist: 2005
European Championship:
Bronze Medalist: 2004

Individual awards

 EHF Champions League Top Scorer: 2008
 Nemzeti Bajnokság I Top Scorer: 2010, 2011

Personal life 
Her partner is László Tico Kozma. She gave birth to their son in 2019, who was a premature baby and lived only 12 days. In April 2021 she has been diagnosed with breast cancer.

References

External links
 Tímea Tóth career statistics at Worldhandball

1980 births
Living people
People from Zalaszentgrót
Hungarian female handball players
Handball players at the 2004 Summer Olympics
Handball players at the 2008 Summer Olympics
Olympic handball players of Hungary
Sportspeople from Zala County